My Sassy Girl is a 2001 South Korean romantic comedy film directed by Kwak Jae-yong, starring Jun Ji-hyun and Cha Tae-hyun. The film is based on a true story told in a series of blog posts written by Kim Ho-sik, who later adapted them into a fictional novel.

The film was very successful in South Korea, where it was the highest-grossing comedy of all time, and one of the top five highest-grossing films ever at the time. When My Sassy Girl was released across East Asia, it became a blockbuster in the region, becoming a hit in Japan, Taiwan and Hong Kong. The film's success in Asia drew comparisons to Titanic. Its DVD release also drew a large international cult following, particularly in China, Southeast Asia, and parts of South Asia. My Sassy Girl sparked an international breakthrough for Korean cinema, and it played a key role in the spread of the Korean Wave.

The film has spawned an international media franchise, consisting of film remakes and television adaptations in different countries as well as a sequel. An American remake, starring Jesse Bradford and Elisha Cuthbert, and directed by Yann Samuell, was released in 2008. A Japanese drama adaptation with Tsuyoshi Kusanagi and actress Rena Tanaka as the leads started broadcasting in April 2008. A sequel, My New Sassy Girl, a collaborative work between Korea and China, was released in 2016. My Sassy Girl has received numerous remakes and adaptations, including Japanese and Korean television adaptations as well as a number of remakes from other countries (American, Indian, Chinese, Nepali, Lithuanian, and Indonesian versions).

Plot

Part 1
The film tells the love story of a male engineering college student, Gyeon-woo, and "the Girl" (whose name is never mentioned in the movie). Gyeon-woo just cannot seem to catch a romantic break. Their personalities stand opposite to the "characteristics traditionally associated with masculinity and femininity...in Asian societies in general".

One day, at dinner and drinks with his college friends, Gyeon-woo is interrupted by a call from his mother, telling him to visit his aunt and meet a potential date. At the train station on his way to his aunt's, he observes a drunk girl, standing precariously close to the edge of the train platform as the train approaches; he pulls her to safety just in time. Inside the train, Gyeon-woo cannot help but stare at the girl who is his "type" but repulsed by her drunkenness. Finally, she throws up on a passenger and faints but not before she calls Gyeon-woo "honey". The passenger aggressively chides Gyeon-woo and tells him to take care of his "girlfriend". Gyeon-woo, completely flustered, leaves her on a subway platform bench, but his conscience compels him to take her to the nearest hotel for safety. While the girl is passed out on the bed, her phone rings and Gyeon-woo picks up. He gives vague answers in regards to the girl's whereabouts and perhaps through GPS tracking, police raid the room and Gyeon-woo gets maced and sent to jail. He is sent home from jail the next morning, and to his surprise he gets a phone-call from the girl, who demands they meet by the train station so she can figure out what happened the night before. Over soju the Girl cries, admits to breaking up with her boyfriend the day before and gets thoroughly drunk, resulting in a second trip to the same hotel. Thus begins his comically ill-fated relationship with the Girl.

After this second overnight stay at the hotel, she begins to become a more active part of his life. She visits Gyeon-woo in college and pulls him out of class, telling the teacher that Gyeon-woo is the father of her soon-to-be-aborted baby. The Girl's mood swings wildly from joyful to downright violent, but Gyeon-woo puts up with it and lets her abuse him for her amusement.

She is an aspiring scriptwriter and throughout the movie gives Gyeon-woo three different screenplays from different genres. The first is an action movie—The Demolition Terminator—which switches gender roles, symbolically having the Girl save her helpless lover (Gyeon-woo). The second is a wild perversion of a Korean short story—Sonagi—in which the Girl, having died, asks that her lover be buried along with her—even though he's still alive. The last is a wuxia/samurai movie spoof full of genre clichés and anachronisms. All three feature the same common thread: the Girl is from the future.

Despite all the horrible things Gyeon-woo endures, he is determined to help cure the girl's pain. He decides to surprise her on her birthday and takes her on a nighttime trip to an amusement park which ends up quite differently from how he planned: the pair encounter an AWOL soldier who holds them hostage and rants about his misery after being jilted. Gyeon-woo convinces him to release her, and she in turn convinces the soldier to free Gyeon-woo and go on with his life and pursue another love.

Part 2
The Girl and Gyeon-woo's relationship takes a turn for the better; her cruel treatment of Gyeon-woo is her way of showing affection and the two grow closer. After a day of hanging out, he walks her home in the pouring rain and she demands he meet her father, who is a habitual drinker. Her parents do not take to Gyeon-woo and on leaving, he overhears an impassioned argument between the girl and her mother over her relationship with him. He does not hear from her for quite some time and his life without her begins.

One day however, the Girl calls him and tells him to bring her a rose during class (the Girl attends an all-girls college) to commemorate their 100th-day anniversary. He does this, leading to a touching and romantic scene where he arrives in disguise as a food delivery person into a packed auditorium and watches her play the melody of George Winston's variations on Pachelbel's Canon in D on a piano onstage. He presents her the rose and the two hug while the classmates applaud in approval at his romantic gesture. As part of their celebration, they hit the bars and clubs together dressed in high-school uniforms; she gets drunk and as Gyeon-woo carries her on his back, a stranger slips him a condom. Gyeon-woo drops her off inside and is confronted at her house by her parents again; the father interrogates him and forces him to empty his pockets, where he embarrassingly presents the condom. Her father demands that the two break up.

The Girl does not contact him again and Gyeon-woo naturally thinks they have broken up, until one day seemingly out of the blue, she calls Gyeon-woo to meet her for dinner as she is on a blind date. The Girl introduces Gyeon-woo to the date, who thinks Gyeon-woo is a great friend of hers based on how highly she speaks of him. She is unusually soft and gentle as there is clear awkwardness between the two. She excuses herself to the washroom and appears to not be handling the break-up so well. The Girl returns to the table to see Gyeon-woo gone; he left while she was in the bathroom, but not before offering the blind date ten rules to follow to ensure her happiness:
At a café, instead of coke or juice order a coffee
Prevent her from over-drinking
Give in to her at every circumstance
When she hits you pretend it hurts when it doesn't and vice versa
Surprise her with a rose on the 100th day anniversary
Make sure you learn Kendo and Squash, and more.
While the blind date recites these rules to her, she realizes how well Gyeon-woo understands her and realizes her love for him. She abruptly leaves her date and searches for Gyeon-woo at the subway station.

They cross paths several times, but never run into each other, so she goes into the subway security office to see the security monitors. She sees him standing close to the edge of the platform (just like she was in the beginning). While an employee makes an announcement in the microphone, she yells his name; he hears and they re-unite at the office.

Once reunited the two realize they are at a turning point in their relationship, but, for some unknown reason, the Girl decides it is time for them to part. As a gesture to their happy times, the two write letters to each other and bury them in a "time capsule" under a particular tree on a mountain in the countryside. They agree to meet again at the tree after two years to read the letters together. After burying the "time capsule" they go their separate ways for good.

Overtime
During the two-year span, Gyeon-woo works hard to improve himself; he practices kendo and squash and learns to swim. To pass the time, he also began writing about his dating experiences with the Girl on the internet as a means to cope. His stories gain so much notoriety that he is approached by movie producers to turn his letters into a movie; he is ecstatic because the Girl's life-long dream was to have one of her screenplays made into a film. He so desperately wants to share this news with her, but chooses to wait until they agree to meet.

Two years have passed and on the agreed date, he travels to the tree on the mountain-top, but the Girl does not show up. He comes day after day without opening the time-capsule in hopes that she would appear, but she never does. Eventually, he opens the time capsule and reads her letter and learns the root of her angst and behavior: Gyeon-woo reminds her of her previous boyfriend who, rather than breaking up with her, actually died before she met Gyeon-woo. On the day they met on the train platform, she was supposed to go on a blind date set up by the mother of her deceased boyfriend, with whom she kept a close bond. Because of her chance meeting with Gyeon-woo, part of her feels that it was her ex that brought the two of them together and she develops guilt for falling in love with him. She needs time apart to heal and move on from her ex alone.

A year after Gyeon-woo visits the tree, the Girl finally arrives. Sitting under the tree is an old man. She reveals that she was supposed to meet someone at the tree a year ago, but that her courage failed her. She believed that if she was truly meant to be with him, destiny would bring them together. During their conversation the old man reveals the secret of the tree, that it is not the same tree; the original tree had been struck and killed by lightning a year before and a similar tree had been planted by a young man so that his special someone would not be sad. The tree was dead and split into two. After the girl reads his letter, she tries repeatedly to call Gyeon-woo, but is unable to reach him.

Some time later, the Girl is on a train and the door closes right before a man tries to board. She has her back turned to him, so she doesn't realize it is Gyeon-woo, who realizes it is her and chases the train down the platform, to no avail. They fail to cross paths again.

As it turns out, the Girl is on her way to lunch with her deceased boyfriend's mother, who has planned to introduce the Girl to her nephew for a blind date. The nephew arrives and it turns out to be Gyeon-woo; as it turns out, Gyeon-woo is the boy that she had been trying to introduce to the Girl for years. The mother offers reasons as to why they'd be a great match for one another, but Gyeon-woo and the Girl are too busy gazing into each other's eyes. The mother asks "Do you two know each other?"; the camera pans out and they are holding hands under the table.

Cast
Jun Ji-hyun as The Girl
Cha Tae-hyun as Gyeon-woo
 Kim In-moon as Gyeon-woo's father
Song Ok-sook as Gyeon-woo's mother
Han Jin-hee as The Girl's father
Im Ho as the Blind Date Guy
Yang Geum-seok as Gyeon-woo's aunt

Release
My Sassy Girl was released in South Korea on July 27, 2001. In the Philippines, the film was released by Amuse Pictures with a Tagalog dub on October 26, 2005.

Box office
My Sassy Girl was the second highest-selling Korean film in 2001 (behind the film Friend), and at the time, it was the highest-grossing Korean comedy film of all time. 4,852,845 tickets were sold nationwide and 1,765,100 in Seoul over its 10 weeks in the cinemas. It grossed  in the country, making it one of the top five highest-grossing films ever in South Korea, at the time. It Japan, it grossed  from a limited release in 2003. The film also grossed $310,415 in Taiwan. In total, the film grossed  in East Asia.

Home media
The film's DVD release was an international success, drawing a large cult following in Asia and beyond. In Japan, for example, it was the best-selling Korean DVD in 2006. There were also a large number of pirated copies in circulation, particularly in Asia. The Blu-Ray release was in 2019.

Critical reception
The film was acclaimed by critics. Koreanfilm.org praised Jun Ji-hyun's portrayal of the character, calling her the "undisputed star" and stating "it could not have succeeded anywhere near as well without her".

Accolades

Soundtrack
The soundtrack album for My Sassy Girl features a variation on Pachelbel's Canon in D) and a soundtrack of twenty-one pieces. The Korean song entitled "I Believe" by Shin Seung Hun (신승훈) is the theme song of this film. The song has been translated to different Asian languages such as Japanese, Chinese and Filipino.

Alternate versions
There are two scenes within the movie that have different soundtracks from each varying version, notably the EDKO and Starmax distributions.
During the scene where Gyeon-woo (as villain) fights the heroine in the Girl's second movie script, the soundtrack to Ashes of Time by Hong Kong filmmaker Wong Kar Wai can be heard, whereas in the Hong Kong-EDKO release the score has been replaced with a Korean track.
During the scene where Gyeon-woo exchanges shoes with the Girl, the song "My Girl" by The Temptations can be heard, whereas in the EDKO release the scene has been rescored with a Korean pop-track.

Remakes and adaptations

Television dramas

Tsuyoshi Kusanagi and actress Rena Tanaka are the lead characters in the Japanese drama of the same name which started broadcasting in April 2008.

A South Korean historical time period drama remake titled My Sassy Girl, starring Joo Won and Oh Yeon-seo, airing this 2017 on SBS.

In Thailand, it was remake as a Thai TV series titled My Sassy Girl started airing on October 11, 2021, on True Asian More starred by Jarinya Sirimongkolsakul and Nutthasit Kotimanuswanich.

American film

This American remake of the film is set in New York City's Central Park and Upper East Side. Director Yann Samuell states "It's a fable about destiny, in the end." whilst Jesse Bradford who plays the lead protagonist summarized the movie as "a romantic comedy about how they pull each other to a more healthy place by virtue of their relationship."

Indian films
An uncredited Bollywood version called Ugly Aur Pagli starring Ranvir Shorey and Mallika Sherawat was released on August 1, 2008. The movie is directed by Sachin Khot.

A Telugu remake of the film was made starring Bharat and Videesha. It was titled Maa Iddhari Madhya.

A Malayalam remake titled White was also made starring Mammootty and Huma Qureshi (in double role) with some changes. While another Malayalam movie Vinodayathra was reported to have scenes inspired from this movie.

Chinese film

A Chinese version named My Sassy Girl 2 (我的野蠻女友2) directed by Joe Ma stars Lynn Hung and Leon Jay Williams was released in 2010.

Nepali film

A Nepali version titled Sano Sansar was released on 12 September 2008 and became very popular amongst teenagers in the country.

Lithuanian film
A Lithuanian version titled Moterys meluoja geriau: Robertėlis was released on 3 August 2018. It was based on the characters form a popular local TV drama.

Philippine film
A Filipino version of My Sassy Girl was announced in 2021, to be starred by Toni Gonzaga and Pepe Herrera. Filming and production completed in the same year, release date has yet to be announced.

Indonesian film
An Indonesian version directed by Fajar Bustomi, and starring Tiara Andini and Jefri Nichol. This version was released on June 23, 2022.

Sequel and references
Cha Tae-hyun starred in the direct sequel, My New Sassy Girl, which was released in China on April 22, 2016, and South Korea on May 5 as a South Korean-Chinese co-production. The movie was not as well-received as its original.

Cha Tae-hyun has made cameo appearances in Jun Ji-hyun's film Windstruck (whose ending scene at the train station is very similar to that of My Sassy Girl) and TV series The Legend of the Blue Sea (Episode 4, where he makes reference to Jun's character's history as "sassy"). A poster of My Sassy Girl appears in My Love from the Star (Episode 5) as one of the previous hit films by Jun's character.

See also
Train Man

References

External links

The original internet serial from which the movie was based, by Kim Ho-sik 
Review at koreanfilm.org

2001 films
2000s Korean-language films
2001 romantic comedy films
Films based on romance novels
Films based on South Korean novels
Films directed by Kwak Jae-yong
Films set in Incheon
Films shot in Incheon
Rail transport films
South Korean films remade in other languages
South Korean romantic comedy films
2000s South Korean films